Tero Juhani Lehterä (born 21 April 1972) is a Finnish former professional ice hockey player who played the majority of his career in the SM-liiga.  He played for Tappara, Jokerit, HPK, and Espoo Blues. He also had stints in Elitserien, the IHL, Russia, Switzerland and Germany. He also won a bronze medal at the 1994 Winter Olympics and World Championship with Finland's 1995 Ice Hockey World Championships team.

Lehterä switched into coaching after retiring his hockey career. He is currently the head coach of SaiPa of the Finnish Liiga. He has also coached several Espoo Blues junior teams and worked as an assistant coach for Blues' first team during the 2015-16 season. He was supposed to become the head coach of Blues, but the team went bankrupt in 2016.

He has also worked as a hockey analyst for tv channels MTV3 and Nelonen.

His nephew, Jori Lehterä, was drafted by the St. Louis Blues and currently plays for the Philadelphia Flyers. His daughter, Nea Lehterä, was in the winning team in the cheerleading world championships in 2022.

Career statistics

Regular season and playoffs

International

External links

1972 births
Living people
Espoo Blues players
Finnish expatriate ice hockey players in Russia
Finnish ice hockey players
Florida Panthers draft picks
Fort Wayne Komets players
HC Neftekhimik Nizhnekamsk players
HPK players
Ice hockey players at the 1994 Winter Olympics
Jokerit players
Medalists at the 1994 Winter Olympics
Olympic ice hockey players of Finland
Olympic medalists in ice hockey
Sportspeople from Espoo
Tappara players